Basilio Figueroa de Jesús (born December 10, 1951) is a Puerto Rican politician and former mayor of Arroyo. Figueroa is affiliated with the New Progressive Party (PNP) and served as mayor from 2003 to 2013.

References

1951 births
Interamerican University of Puerto Rico alumni
Living people
Mayors of places in Puerto Rico
New Progressive Party (Puerto Rico) politicians
People from Arroyo, Puerto Rico
Puerto Rican people of Galician descent